The southern brown tree frog (Litoria ewingii), also known as the brown tree frog, whistling tree frog, or Ewing's tree frog, is a species of tree frog native to Australia: most of southern Victoria, eastern South Australia, southern New South Wales from about Ulladulla—although this species is reported to occur further north—and throughout Tasmania including the Bass Strait Islands, in which state it is the most frequently encountered frog. It has been introduced to New Zealand, where it can be locally abundant.

Taxonomy
The southern brown tree frog was described in 1841 by French naturalists André Duméril and Gabriel Bibron.

Evolution
L. ewingi is one of the classic examples of speciation by reinforcement. Future research into congener hybridisation and gene flow may find such occurring, and may find countervailing reinforcement mechanisms at work.

Description
This species reaches  in length. It is pale to dark brown on the dorsal surface, with a broad darker patch starting at the eyes and covering the majority of the back, although pure green and green striped colour morphs are also common. A dark band starting at the nostril runs across the eye and tympanum to the shoulder, and a pale white stripe below this runs from the mouth to the arm. The backs of the thighs are orange, and no black marbling is present (except specimens from the Adelaide region), distinguishing this species from the similar whistling tree frog, (Litoria verreauxii). Some specimens from western Victoria and south eastern South Australia can be partially or entirely green. The belly is cream.

Ecology and behavior

This species is found in a wide range of habitats, including forests, farmland, heathland, semiarid areas, alpine regions, and suburban areas. They are particularly common in parts of suburban Adelaide, Melbourne, and Hobart, where they are often observed upon window panes at night, attracted by flying insects. Males make a whistling weep-weep-weep call from beside or floating in the water of, dam impoundments, ditches, ponds, and stream-side pools. Males call all year round, particularly after rain. Eggs are easily identifiable, being wound around submerged grass stems, aquatic vegetation, and sticks.
These frogs can freeze and survive although freezing is likely costly for the species.

As a pet
In Australia, this animal may be kept without any wildlife license when purchased from a breeder. Litoria ewingi does not require any UV supplementation, it simply requires a light cycle and a small water source as it is an arboreal species. However, this species is commonly active during daylight hours, despite being considered primarily nocturnal and crepuscular. Therefore, UV supplementation will likely contribute to providing a quality habitat and healthier, happier frogs.

Citations

References

Robinson, M. 2002. A Field Guide to Frogs of Australia. Australian Museum/Reed New Holland: Sydney.
Frogs Australia Network-frog call available here.
Frogs of Australia
Article Road: List of All Frog Breeds: Things You Can Do to Ensure Your Frog Has a Long, Happy and Healthy Life: Brown Tree Frog
Department of Environment, Climate Change and Water, New South Wales: Amphibian Keeper's Licence: Species Lists
Call of Ewings brown tree frog

External links

Litoria
Amphibians of New South Wales
Amphibians of South Australia
Amphibians of Tasmania
Amphibians of Victoria (Australia)
Amphibians described in 1841
Taxa named by André Marie Constant Duméril
Taxa named by Gabriel Bibron
Frogs of Australia